Sankt Georgen ob Murau is a former municipality in the district of Murau in Styria, Austria. Since the 2015 Styria municipal structural reform, it is part of the municipality Sankt Georgen am Kreischberg.

References

Cities and towns in Murau District